Cynthia Flynn Capers (born 3 January 1945) is a nurse, educator, researcher and administrator.  She is Dean of the University of Akron’s School of Nursing, Chair of the Pennsylvania State Board of Nursing, national advisor to the Johnson & Johnson Campaign for Nursing's Future,  and board member of the Commission on Collegiate Nursing Education.

Early life 
Capers was born on 3 January 1945 in Harrisburg, Pennsylvania. She is the daughter of Charles E. Flynn and Lucy Gibbs Flynn (later Bibby).

Education 
Capers began her nursing education at Freedmen’s Hospital School of Nursing (now Howard University Hospital), a historically Black hospital and nurses' training school in Washington, D.C.
She graduated from Freedmen’s Hospital with her RN diploma in 1965.

She enrolled at the University of Maryland and graduated with her bachelor’s degree in nursing in 1968. She then attended the University of Pennsylvania in their Child and Adolescent Psychiatry program, graduating with a masters in nursing science degree relating to family and pediatric nursing in 1981.

Capers returned to the University of Pennsylvania, with support from the American Nurses Association (ANA) Minority Fellowship Program (ANAMFP).  She received her PhD in nursing in 1986. She was the first Black student to graduate from the School of Nursing’s PhD program. With the ANA’s support, she was a Postdoctoral Fellow at the University of Pennsylvania from 1989 to 1990, the first Minority person to receive a post-doctoral fellowship there.

Capers was a selected participant of Harvard University’s Institute for Management and Leadership in Education in 2001.

She is a member of the Alpha Kappa Alpha Sorority Inc. Her portrait was published in Spring 1997, Vol. 75, No. 1, of The  Ivy  Leaf, which chronicles the Sorority.

Career 

While attending the University of Maryland, she worked in pediatrics as a part-time clinical nurse. After attaining her BSN from the University of Maryland, she moved to Philadelphia and began working at Philadelphia General Hospital (PGH) School of Nursing teaching Maternity Nursing.

After completing her MSN and the course work for her PhD at the University of Pennsylvania, she accepted a position as assistant professor at La Salle University. Concurrently, she completed her dissertation, attained her PhD and began her postdoctoral work.

Capers has worked primarily in nursing education, including at Thomas Jefferson University.

In 1997, Capers joined the University of Akron, and was appointed Dean of the University of Akron's College of Nursing in 2002 and served in that position until 2012. While at Akron she helped to establish the College of Nursing's Center for Gerontological Health Nursing and Advocacy.

Research 

For her PhD dissertation, Capers’ research addressed views about psychiatric behaviors and mental health. Her dissertation, titled “Perceptions of problematic behavior as held by lay black adults and registered nurses” (1986), addressed how the label of “mental illness” can change across education and race, and how educational attainment and access to healthcare influence a social group’s definition of mental illness.

For her postdoctoral research, Capers evaluated the family dynamics of those with adolescent mothers giving birth to premature infants. This work attempts to determine the identifies of adolescent mothers' primary emotional and physical caregivers, and their characteristic challenges and needs to enable health care providers to more effectively support these families.

In addition, Capers has published articles on topics such as obesity, adolescent health, psychiatric nursing, and teaching diversity.

Publications 
Capers’ published works include:

Awards 

 1995 Distinguished Nurse Award from the Pennsylvania Nurses Association
 1995 Resolution from the Pennsylvania State Board of Nursing for Outstanding Contributions
 1997 Award for Outstanding Achievement, Leadership and Service from the Medical Society of Eastern Pennsylvania
 2006 ATHENA Award for community service and active role in aiding women attain professional excellence and leadership

References 

1945 births
Living people
American nurses
American nursing administrators
Nursing school deans
American university and college faculty deans
Women deans (academic)
University of Maryland, Baltimore alumni
Howard University alumni
University of Pennsylvania alumni
La Salle University faculty
Thomas Jefferson University faculty
University of Akron faculty
People from Harrisburg, Pennsylvania
American women nurses
21st-century American women
African-American nurses